Zoa Morani (born 29 March 1988) is an Indian model and actress who appears in Bollywood films. She has appeared in films and web series with her notable works being Always Kabhi Kabhi (2011), Bhaag Johnny (2015), Taish	(2020) and Tuesdays & Fridays (2021).

Morani is the daughter of, film producer and co-owner of Cineyug, Karim Morani and the niece of film producers Aly Morani and Mohammed Morani. Her aunt Lucky Morani (wife of Mohammed) is a fashion designer and actress.

Career
Morani started as an assistant director for the 2007 film Om Shanti Om and was assistant director for Halla Bol (2008). Morani had no interest in directing films, but took up these roles to familiarise herself with acting. She made her acting debut in Shahrukh Khan's production Always Kabhi Kabhi in 2011 and has been signed by film director Shyam Benegal for his next film. In 2011, she took up a modelling assignment during the Lakme Fashion Week. She has since appeared in the 2012 edition of the Lakme Fashion Week 
.

Morani was signed by Vikram Bhatt for his film Bhaag Johnny opposite Kunal Khemu and Mandana Karimi. The film was co-produced by Bhushan Kumar and Vikram Bhatt and released in 2015.

Personal life
From the Morani family, she is the daughter of film producer Karim Morani who owns Cineyug with his brothers Aly Morani and Mohammed Morani (husband of Lucky Morani). Her sister is also affiliated with Cineyug and is married to actress Padmini Kolhapure's son Priyank Sharma. She is a Nizari Muslim. She got afflicted with COVID-19 during the height of its spread in India but subsequently recovered.

Filmography

As actress

As assistant director

References

External links 

 

1989 births
Indian Ismailis
Indian film actresses
Living people
Actresses in Hindi cinema
21st-century Indian film directors
21st-century Indian actresses
Indian women film directors
Indian female models
Female models from Mumbai
Actresses from Mumbai
Khoja Ismailism
Gujarati people